Singapore School Manila is an international school in Aseana City, Parañaque, Philippines, that follows the Singaporean educational system. The grades start from kindergarten 1,2, then primary 1-6 then secondary 1-6, then Pre-University levels (IBDP or Cambridge AS/A). Singapore School Cebu, Singapore School Green Campus, and Singapore School Clark are its sister schools.

History
Singapore School Manila was originally located in Paseo de Magallanes Strip Mall (Formerly Magallanes Commercial Center) in Brgy. Magallanes, Makati in 2004, the Singapore School Manila was moved to a bigger campus in Aseana City  Entertainment City in Parañaque around 2014.

External links
Singapore School Manila
Singapore School Manila Green Campus

Philippines
Cambridge schools in the Philippines
International Baccalaureate schools in the Philippines
International schools in Metro Manila
Schools in Parañaque